South Carolina "Carrie" Bronson Hatfield (September 9, 1876 – May 8, 1962) was the wife of former Governor of West Virginia Henry D. Hatfield and served as that state's First Lady, 1913-1917.  She was born September 9, 1876, at Warfield, Kentucky. In 1895, she married Henry D. Hatfield.  As first lady, she hosted social gatherings and participated in Charleston civic affairs. After leaving office, the Hatfields resided in Washington, D.C. where Gov. Hatfield served a term in the United States Senate, then moved to Huntington, West Virginia where she died on May 8, 1962.

References

1876 births
1962 deaths
People from Martin County, Kentucky
First Ladies and Gentlemen of West Virginia
Hatfield family